"A Scandal in Bohemia" is the first short story, and the third overall work, featuring Arthur Conan Doyle's fictional detective Sherlock Holmes. It is the first of the 56 Holmes short stories written by Doyle and the first of 38 Sherlock Holmes works illustrated by Sidney Paget. The story is notable for introducing the character of Irene Adler, who is one of the most notable female characters in the Sherlock Holmes series, despite appearing in only one story. Doyle ranked "A Scandal in Bohemia" fifth in his list of his twelve favourite Holmes stories.

"A Scandal in Bohemia" was first published on 25 June 1891 in the July issue of The Strand Magazine, and was the first of the stories collected in The Adventures of Sherlock Holmes in 1892.

Plot summary
On 20 March 1888, Dr. Watson is visiting Sherlock Holmes when a masked gentleman arrives at 221B Baker Street. Initially introducing himself as Count von Kramm, he reveals himself as Wilhelm Gottsreich Sigismond von Ormstein, Grand Duke of Cassel-Felstein and hereditary King of Bohemia, after Holmes deduces his true identity. The King explains that, five years earlier, he engaged in a secret relationship with American opera singer Irene Adler, who has since retired and now lives in London. He is set to marry a young Scandinavian princess but worries that her strictly principled family will call the marriage off should they learn of this impropriety.

The King further explains that he seeks to regain a photograph of Adler and himself together which he gave to her as a token. His agents have failed to recover the photograph through various means, and an offer to pay for it was also refused. With Adler now threatening to send the photograph to his fiancée's family, the King requests Holmes and Watson's help in recovering it.

The next morning, a disguised Holmes goes to Adler's house. He discovers Adler has a gentleman friend, barrister Godfrey Norton, who calls at least once a day. On this particular day, Norton visits Adler and soon afterward takes a cab to a nearby church. Minutes later, the lady herself gets into her landau, bound for the same place. Holmes follows in a cab and enters the church, where he is unexpectedly asked to be a witness to Norton and Adler's wedding. Curiously, the newly-weds go their separate ways after the ceremony.

Returning to Baker Street, Holmes recounts his tale to Watson and expresses his amusement at his role in Adler's wedding. He also asks whether or not Watson is willing to participate in an illegal scheme to figure out where the picture is hidden in Adler's house. Watson agrees, and Holmes changes into another disguise as a clergyman. They depart Baker Street for Adler's house.

When Holmes and Watson arrive, a group of jobless men meanders throughout the street. When Adler's coach pulls up, Holmes enacts his plan. A fight breaks out between the men on the street over who gets to help Adler. Holmes rushes into the fight to protect Adler and is seemingly struck and injured, though it is later revealed that this is a self-inflicted splatter of red paint. Adler takes him into her sitting room, where Holmes motions for her to have the window opened. As Holmes lifts his hand, Watson recognizes a pre-arranged signal and tosses in a plumber's smoke rocket. While smoke billows out of the building, Watson shouts "Fire!" and the cry is echoed up and down the street.

Holmes slips out of Adler's house and tells Watson what he saw. As Holmes expected, Adler rushed to get her most precious possession at the cry of "fire"—the photograph of herself and the King. Holmes observes that the picture was kept in a recess behind a sliding panel just above the right bell pull. He was unable to steal it at that moment, however, because the coachman was watching him.

The following morning, Holmes explains his findings to the King. When Holmes, Watson, and the King arrive at Adler's house at 8 am, her elderly maidservant sardonically informs them she had left the country via train earlier that morning. Holmes quickly goes to the photograph's hiding spot, finding a photo of Irene Adler in an evening dress and a letter addressed to him, dated at midnight. In the letter, Adler tells Holmes he did very well in finding the photograph and taking her in with his disguises. Adler has left England with Norton, "a better man" than the King, adding she will not compromise the King, despite being "cruelly wronged" by him; she had kept the photo only to protect herself from further action he might take.

Thanking Holmes effusively, the King offers a valuable emerald ring from his finger as a further reward. Holmes declines and says there is something he values even more highly: the photograph of Adler, which he keeps as a reminder of her cleverness. Watson concludes the story by noting that, since their meeting, Holmes always referred to Adler by the honourable title of "the woman."

In the short story's opening paragraph, Watson calls her "the late Irene Adler," suggesting she is deceased. However, it has been speculated that the word "late" might actually mean "former." She married Godfrey Norton, making Adler her former name. (Doyle employs this same usage in "The Adventure of the Priory School" in reference to the Duke's former status as a cabinet minister.)

Holmes' relationship to Adler
Adler earns Holmes' unbounded admiration. When the King of Bohemia says, "Would she not have made an admirable queen?  Is it not a pity she was not on my level?" Holmes replies that Adler is indeed on a much different level from the King, implying that she was superior to the King all along.

The beginning of "A Scandal in Bohemia" describes the high regard in which Holmes held Adler:

This "memory" is kept alive by a photograph of Irene Adler, which had been deliberately left behind when she and her new husband took flight with the embarrassing photograph of her with the King. Holmes had then asked for and received this photo from the King, as payment for his work on the case. In "The Five Orange Pips" he comments to a client that he has been defeated on a mere handful of occasions and only once by a woman.

In derivative works, she is frequently used as a romantic interest for Holmes, a departure from Doyle's novels where he only admired her for her wit and cunning. In his Sherlock Holmes Handbook, Christopher Redmond notes "the Canon provides little basis for either sentimental or prurient speculation about a Holmes-Adler connection."

Publication history
"A Scandal in Bohemia" was first published in the UK in The Strand Magazine in July 1891, and in the United States in the US edition of the Strand in August 1891. The story was published with ten illustrations by Sidney Paget in The Strand Magazine. It was included in the short story collection The Adventures of Sherlock Holmes, which was published in October 1892.

Adaptations

Stage
William Gillette's 1899 stage play Sherlock Holmes is based on several stories, among them "A Scandal in Bohemia". Films released in 1916 (starring Gillette as Holmes) and 1922 (starring John Barrymore), both titled Sherlock Holmes, were based on the play, as was a 1938 Mercury Theatre on the Air radio adaptation titled The Immortal Sherlock Holmes, starring Orson Welles as Holmes.

The 1965 Broadway musical Baker Street was loosely based on the story, making Irene Adler into the heroine and adding Professor Moriarty as the villain.

Steven Dietz's 2006 play Sherlock Holmes: The Final Adventure, adapted from the 1899 play Sherlock Holmes, merges the storylines of "A Scandal in Bohemia" and The Final Problem. In this adaptation, Godfrey Norton is under the employ of Professor Moriarty and whose original plan was to rob Adler. However, they ended up falling in love, complicating the plan and forcing Moriarty to intervene when Holmes begins investigating on behalf of the King.

Film
The story was adapted as a 1921 silent short film as part of the Stoll film series starring Eille Norwood as Holmes.

The 1946 film Dressed to Kill, starring Basil Rathbone as Sherlock Holmes and Nigel Bruce as Dr. Watson, features several references to "A Scandal in Bohemia", with Holmes and Watson discussing the recent publication of the story in The Strand Magazine (albeit anachronistically, the film takes place in its current day), and the villain of the film using the same trick on Watson that Holmes uses on Irene Adler in the story.

The Adventure of Sherlock Holmes' Smarter Brother, a 1975 Gene Wilder film, parodies the basic storyline, with the female lead replaced with a music hall singer.

The 1998 film Zero Effect is loosely based on the story, set in late 90s America, with Bill Pullman as Daryl Zero and Ben Stiller as Steve Arlo, both based on the Holmes and Watson characters, respectively. Kim Dickens plays Gloria Sullivan, the Irene Adler character, while Ryan O'Neal is Gregory Stark, the King of Bohemia equivalent.

Radio
The second episode of The Adventures of Sherlock Holmes featured an adaptation by Edith Meiser of the story on 27 October 1930 and starred Clive Brook as Holmes and Leigh Lovell as Watson. A remake of the script aired in March 1933, with Richard Gordon playing Sherlock Holmes and Leigh Lovell again playing Dr. Watson. Another remake of the script aired in August 1936, with Gordon as Holmes and Harry West as Watson.

Basil Rathbone and Nigel Bruce, who played Holmes and Watson in the film Dressed to Kill and other films, did the story for their radio series, The New Adventures of Sherlock Holmes. The episode aired on 10 December 1945, and was followed by a sequel, "Second Generation", featuring Irene's daughter hiring Holmes in retirement. "Second Generation" aired on 17 December 1945.

A radio adaptation starring John Gielgud as Holmes and Ralph Richardson as Watson aired in October 1954 on the BBC Light Programme. The production was also broadcast on NBC radio in January 1955, and on ABC radio in May 1956.

Michael Hardwick adapted the story as a radio production which aired on the BBC Light Programme in 1966, as part of the 1952–1969 radio series. Carleton Hobbs played Sherlock Holmes and Norman Shelley played Dr. Watson.

A radio adaptation was broadcast as an episode of the series CBS Radio Mystery Theater in 1977, with Kevin McCarthy as Sherlock Holmes and Court Benson as Dr. Watson. Marian Seldes played Irene Adler.

Bert Coules dramatised "A Scandal in Bohemia" for BBC Radio 4 in 1990, as an episode of the 1989–1998 radio series, starring Clive Merrison as Holmes and Michael Williams as Watson. It also featured Andrew Sachs as the King (Sachs would then go on to play Watson in Coules' radio series The Further Adventures of Sherlock Holmes in 2002–2010).

The story was adapted as a 2012 episode of the American radio series The Classic Adventures of Sherlock Holmes, with John Patrick Lowrie as Holmes and Lawrence Albert as Watson.

Television
The story was adapted for a 1951 TV episode of We Present Alan Wheatley as Mr Sherlock Holmes in... starring Alan Wheatley as Holmes, Raymond Francis as Dr. Watson and Olga Edwardes as Irene Adler.

"A Scandal in Bohemia" was adapted as part of the Soviet television film series The Adventures of Sherlock Holmes and Dr. Watson, in the form of a flashback in The Treasures of Agra; two episodes adapting The Sign of the Four (1983, USSR). It starred Vasily Livanov as Sherlock Holmes, Vitaly Solomin as Dr. Watson, Georgiy Martirosyan as the King of Bohemia and Larisa Solovyova as Irene Adler.

"A Scandal in Bohemia" was adapted as the first episode of the 1984–1985 television series The Adventures of Sherlock Holmes. The episode featured Jeremy Brett as Holmes, David Burke as Watson, and Gayle Hunnicutt as Irene Adler, whose first name is pronounced "Irena" in this adaptation.

"A Scandal in Bohemia" was featured in a season 1 episode of the PBS series Wishbone, entitled "A Dogged Exposé". In the episode, the supporting human characters search for an incognito photographer at their school who has been publishing embarrassing photographs of students. Intermingled with the plot, the title character Wishbone portrays Sherlock Holmes in a slightly modified adaptation of the original story to compare with the events of the "real-life" plot.

A series of four television movies produced in the early 2000s starred Matt Frewer as Sherlock Holmes and Kenneth Welsh as Dr. Watson. One of these films, The Royal Scandal, adapted "A Scandal in Bohemia" and combined its story with "The Bruce-Partington Plans".

"A Scandal in Belgravia", episode one of the second series of the TV series Sherlock, was loosely adapted from the short story and aired on January 1 2012, starring Benedict Cumberbatch as Holmes, Martin Freeman as Watson and Lara Pulver as Irene Adler. The plot of the short story – Holmes and Watson attempting to recover incriminating photos from Adler – is covered briefly in the first half of the episode updated for the contemporary period (Adler's photos are stored digitally on her mobile phone) and adjusted (the royal they incriminate is British and female); the episode then moves on to a storyline based on other Sherlock Holmes stories and films while including Adler, Mycroft Holmes (Mark Gatiss) and Jim Moriarty.

"A Scandal in Bohemia" was adapted to the second episode "The Adventure of the Headmaster with Trouble" of NHK puppetry Sherlock Holmes. Holmes is a pupil of an imaginary boarding school Beeton School. One day he pretends to be ill and goes to the nurse's office to search the photo that Headmaster Ormstein and school nurse Irene Adler are in. But Adler sees through his feigned illness. Then Holmes and his roommate John H. Watson make a false fire to find the photo but she penetrates their wiles and tells Holmes that she returned the photo to Ormstein.

The hereditary king makes an appearance in a season six episode of Elementary entitled "Breathe."

Fictional monarchies

Rather than creating a fictional country for the King in his story, Conan Doyle chose to place a fictional dynasty in a real country. The Kingdom of Bohemia was at the time of writing a possession of the House of Habsburg and the Austrian Emperors held the title "King of Bohemia". Although Bohemian nobles had offered the crown to other Germanic families twice since the Middle Ages (Frederick of the Palatine in 1618 and Charles of Bavaria in 1741), claiming the title formally had elective succession.

On the other hand, there had never been a "Kingdom of Scandinavia". The closest instance was the personal union of Denmark, Norway and Sweden under the Kalmar Union, which was never formalised like the British Acts of Union and broke down in the 16th century.

However after the Kalmar Union was dissolved by Gustav Vasa's coronation the Kingdom of Norway remained in personal union with Denmark before the Napoleonic Wars changed that to a union with Sweden, which existed until 14 years after publication (the whole time under King Oscar II) and this might have been the "Kingdom of Scandinavia" Conan Doyle meant.

The surname of the King's fiancée was that of the actual ruling house of the Duchy of Saxe-Meiningen. At publication ruled by George II, Duke of Saxe-Meiningen, a cadet member of the Ernestine duchies ruled by various cousins from the House of Wettin, whose Saxe-Coburg line produced Queen Victoria's mother Victoria and husband Albert.

There was also no "Grand Duchy of Cassel-Felstein" and in fact there was no major title with the name Felstein. The closest match is a collective municipality named Feldstein. But there was a possible inspiration in the former Landgraviate of Hesse, which was partitioned into four parts in the 16th century. While two went extinct swiftly and were divided by the remaining pair, both of those probably inspired the title.

One was the Landgraviate of Hesse-Kassel, which was spelled with "Cassel" before the 20th century spelling reform of German changed the city's name. This title was elevated to the Electorate of Hesse during the Napoleonic Wars, but by the time of publication had been annexed by the Kingdom of Prussia for 25 years as the Province of Hesse-Nassau.

The Landgraviate of Hesse-Darmstadt also has a probable connection to the fictional title, since it was elevated to the Grand Duchy of Hesse in 1806. At the time of publication its ruler was Louis IV, Grand Duke of Hesse, whose first wife had been Queen Victoria's third child Princess Alice of the United Kingdom.

Notes

References and sources 
References

Sources
 
 
 
LitChart.com

External links

 
 

1891 short stories
Bohemia
Sherlock Holmes short stories by Arthur Conan Doyle
Works originally published in The Strand Magazine
Fiction set in 1888